The 2000 Fiji Sevens was a rugby sevens tournament held in Fiji as part of the inaugural IRB Sevens World Series. It was the eighth and final edition of the Fiji International Sevens and, in the wake of the Fijian coup d'état later that year, remains the only Fijian event so far included on the World Sevens circuit. The tournament was the sixth leg of the 1999-2000 Series.

The competition took place on 11 and 12 February at the National Stadium in Suva. Hosts, Fiji, were defeated 31-5 in the final by New Zealand, who claimed their third title of the series.

Teams
Sixteen national teams played in the tournament:

Pool stage
The pool stage was played on the first day of the tournament. The 16 teams were separated into four pools of four teams and teams in the same pool played each other once. The top two teams in each pool advanced to the Cup quarterfinals to compete for the 2000 Fiji Sevens title.

Pool A

Source: World Rugby

Source: World Rugby

Pool B

Source: World Rugby

Source: World Rugby

Pool C

Source: World Rugby

Source: World Rugby

Pool D

Source: World Rugby

Source: World Rugby

Finals

Bowl

Source: World Rugby

Plate

Source: World Rugby

Cup

Source: World Rugby

Tournament placings

Source: Rugby7.com

Series standings
At the completion of Round 6:

Source: Rugby7.com

References

2000
1999–2000 IRB Sevens World Series
2000 rugby sevens competitions
2000 in Fijian rugby union
2000 in Oceanian rugby union